Octonoba is a genus of Asian cribellate orb weavers first described in 1979 by Brent Opell. Members of this genus and those of Purumitra both have a large concave median apophysis and a conspicuous hematodocha. However, these spiders are generally much larger, with a carapace greater than 1.4 millimeters long, where those of Purumitra are usually less than 1 millimeter long.

Species
, it contains 33 species:

Octonoba albicola Yoshida, 2012 – Taiwan
Octonoba ampliata Dong, Zhu & Yoshida, 2005 – China
Octonoba aurita Dong, Zhu & Yoshida, 2005 – China
Octonoba basuensis Hu, 2001 – China
Octonoba bicornuta Seo, 2018 – Korea
Octonoba biforata Zhu, Sha & Chen, 1989 – China
Octonoba dentata Dong, Zhu & Yoshida, 2005 – China
Octonoba digitata Dong, Zhu & Yoshida, 2005 – China
Octonoba grandiconcava Yoshida, 1981 – Japan (Ryukyu Is.)
Octonoba grandiprojecta Yoshida, 1981 – Japan (Ryukyu Is.)
Octonoba kentingensis Yoshida, 2012 – Taiwan
Octonoba lanyuensis Yoshida, 2012 – Taiwan
Octonoba longshanensis Xie, Peng, Zhang, Gong & Kim, 1997 – China
Octonoba okinawensis Yoshida, 1981 – Japan (Okinawa)
Octonoba paralongshanensis Dong, Zhu & Yoshida, 2005 – China
Octonoba paravarians Dong, Zhu & Yoshida, 2005 – China
Octonoba rimosa Yoshida, 1983 – Japan (Ryukyu Is.)
Octonoba sanyanensis Barrion, Barrion-Dupo & Heong, 2013 – China (Hainan)
Octonoba senkakuensis Yoshida, 1983 – Japan
Octonoba serratula Dong, Zhu & Yoshida, 2005 – China
Octonoba sinensis (Simon, 1880) – China, Korea, Japan. Introduced to USA
Octonoba spinosa Yoshida, 1982 – Taiwan
Octonoba sybotides (Bösenberg & Strand, 1906) – China, Korea, Japan
Octonoba taiwanica Yoshida, 1982 – Taiwan
Octonoba tanakai Yoshida, 1981 – Japan (Ryukyu Is.)
Octonoba uncinata Yoshida, 1981 – Japan (Ryukyu Is.)
Octonoba varians (Bösenberg & Strand, 1906) – China, Korea, Japan
Octonoba wanlessi Zhang, Zhu & Song, 2004 – China
Octonoba xihua Barrion, Barrion-Dupo & Heong, 2013 – China (Hainan)
Octonoba yaeyamensis Yoshida, 1981 – Japan (Ryukyu Is.)
Octonoba yaginumai Yoshida, 1981 – Japan (Okinawa)
Octonoba yesoensis (Saito, 1934) – Caucasus, Russia (Far East), Iran to Japan
Octonoba yoshidai Tanikawa, 2006 – Japan

References

Uloboridae
Araneomorphae genera
Spiders of Asia